Alfred Verdyck (7 May 1882 – 30 July 1964) was a Belgian footballer.

Career
He was goalkeeper for Antwerp F.C. before the First World War. Later he was the first coach, known as the Great Old from 1919 to 1930. He led the anversois to their first Belgian champions title in 1929.

He played the first official match for Belgium on 1 May 1904, in Brussels against France (3-3).

Honours 
 Belgian international in 1904 (1 cap)

References

External links
 

Belgian footballers
Belgium international footballers
Royal Antwerp F.C. players
Belgian football managers
Royal Antwerp F.C. managers
1882 births
1964 deaths
Place of birth missing
Association football goalkeepers